Mayna pubescens is a species of flowering plant in the Achariaceae family that is endemic to Colombia.

References

pubescens
Endemic flora of Colombia
Endangered plants
Taxonomy articles created by Polbot